The Ginger Snapped is the second studio album by American drag performer Jinkx Monsoon, released on January 12, 2018. The album was produced by Yair Evnine and features guest appearances by Amanda Palmer, Lady Rizo, and Fred Schneider. It was inspired by alternative music of the 1990s and 2000s.

Background
A follow-up to 2014's The Inevitable Album, The Ginger Snapped was described as "a departure from our well known cabaret style, diving into our favorite rock influences. We drew inspiration from our favorite rock and ska artists of the 90's". The album was fully funded through Kickstarter. In the Kickstarter pitch, Monsoon described the album as having a "90's garage band throwback sound".

Track listing
Track listing adapted from Billboard and AllMusic. All tracks composed by Jinkx Monsoon and Major Scales; except where indicated.

References

2018 albums
Crowdfunded albums
Jinkx Monsoon albums
Producer Entertainment Group albums